The Abuhav Synagogue is a 15th-century synagogue in Safed, Israel, named after 15th-century Spanish rabbi and kabbalist, Isaac Abuhav. Its design is said to be based upon kabbalistic teachings.

History
According to tradition Rabbi Abuhav designed the synagogue and his disciples erected the building in Safed when they arrived in the 1490s after the expulsion from Spain. Another legend claims that the synagogue was transported miraculously from Spain to Safed. The synagogue was almost completely destroyed in the 1837 earthquake, only the southern wall containing the arks remained standing and exists today as a remnant of the original building.

The bimah has six steps representing the six working days of the week; the top level is seventh, representing the Shabbat. The Holy Ark has three sections and contain Torah scrolls traditionally written by Abuhav himself and Solomon Ohana of Fes, Morocco.

See also
Religion in Israel

References 

Synagogues in Safed
Buildings and structures in Northern District (Israel)
Medieval sites in Israel
15th-century synagogues
Sephardi Jewish culture in Israel
Sephardi synagogues